The 1907 East Wicklow by-election was held on 29 July 1907.  The by-election was held due to the resignation of the incumbent Irish Parliamentary MP, Denis Joseph Cogan.  It was won by the Irish Parliamentary candidate the previous MP for North Donegal, John Muldoon, who was unopposed.

References

1907 elections in Ireland
1907 elections in the United Kingdom
By-elections to the Parliament of the United Kingdom in County Wicklow constituencies
Unopposed by-elections to the Parliament of the United Kingdom (need citation)